Potassium adipate is a compound with formula K2C6H8O4. It is a potassium salt and common source ingredient of adipic acid.

It has E number E357.

See also
 Sodium adipate

References

Adipates
Food additives
Potassium compounds
Food acidity regulators
E-number additives